The European Joint Conferences on Theory and Practice of Software (ETAPS) is a confederation of (currently) four computer science conferences taking place annually at one conference site, usually end of March or early April. Three of the four conferences (FoSSaCS, FASE, TACAS) are top ranked in software engineering and one (ESOP) is top ranked in programming languages.

Constituting conferences  
ETAPS currently confederates the following conferences:

 European Symposium on Programming (ESOP, since 1998)
 Foundations of Software Science and Computation Structures (FoSSaCS, since 1998)
 Fundamental Approaches to Software Engineering (FASE, since 1998)
 Tools and Algorithms for the Construction and Analysis of Systems (TACAS, since 1998)

From 1995 to 2015, the International Conference on Compiler Construction (CC) and from 2012 to 2019 Principles of Security and Trust (POST)  were constituting conferences as well.

TACAS 
TACAS (Tools and Algorithms for the Construction and Analysis of Systems) is a conference that focuses on the application of and tool support for various formal methods. It is one of the top ranked conferences for software engineering. It was founded by Bernhard Steffen, Rance Cleaveland, Ed Brinksma, and Kim Larsen. The first TACAS was held in 1995 in Aarhus, Denmark followed by the conferences in 1996 in Passau, Germany and 1997 in Enschede, Netherlands. TACAS was one of the first five constituting conferences of ETAPS in 1998.

ESOP 
ESOP (European Symposium on Programming) is a conference that focuses on fundamental issues in the specification, design, analysis, and implementation of programming languages and systems. It is one of the top ranked conferences for programming languages. The first edition of ESOP was held in March 1986 in Saarbrücken.

FASE 
FASE (Fundamental Approaches to Software Engineering) is a conference that focuses on the foundations which software engineering is built on. It replaced the conference Formal Aspects/Approaches to Software Engineering while keeping its acronym.

FoSSaCS 
FoSSaCS (International Conference on Foundations of Software Science and Computation Structures) is a conference that focuses on foundational research in software science, especially theories and methods for the analysis, integration, synthesis, transformation, and verification of programs and software systems. Its first edition was held as part of first ETAPS in 1998. It can be seen as a successor of  the conference CAAP, Colloque sur les Arbres en Algèbre et en Programmation.

Test of time award
The ETAPS Test of Time Award recognizes "outstanding papers published more than 10 years in the past" in one of the constituent conferences of ETAPS and the "impact of excellent research results" that have been published at ETAPS.

References

External links 
 
 List of previous conferences

Computer science conferences